Abdiweli Ibrahim Sheikh Muudey is a Somali politician. He is the former Minister of Labour of Somalia, having been appointed to the position on 6 February 2015 by former Prime Minister Omar Abdirashid Ali Sharmarke. He has now been succeeded by Salah Ahmed Jama.

References

 Living people
 Government ministers of Somalia
 Year of birth missing (living people)